Anna Häfele (born 26 June 1989 in Bad Arolsen, Hesse) is a German ski jumper. She came at the second place in the FIS Junior Ski Jumping World Championships 2009 in Štrbské Pleso, Slovakia. She received an eight place in the World Championship in Liberec 2009 and has three wins from the Ladies Continental Cup (the highest level).

References

1989 births
Living people
People from Bad Arolsen
Sportspeople from Kassel (region)
German female ski jumpers
21st-century German women